KML-010 is a drug derived from spiperone. It functions as a highly selective 5-HT2A receptor antagonist, with negligible affinity for the 5-HT1A or 5-HT2C receptors, and over 400-fold lower affinity for the D2 receptor in comparison to spiperone.

See also 
 Spiperone

References 

5-HT2A antagonists
Fluoroarenes
Aromatic ketones
Spiro compounds
Imidazolidinones